Vodacom Soccer Spectacular is a soccer tournament that was launched by Vodacom Lesotho in 2008 and took place in 2011.

Description 
The Vodacom Soccer Spectacular soccer tournament was launched by Vodacom Lesotho in 2008 and took place in 2011.  Soccer Spectacular was opened for teams in First division and Premier League teams. The fans voted for their favourite team with the four clubs with the most votes qualifying for the tournament. The total of 36 teams from first division teams and premier league teams to be in the first four will participate in the final knock-out games.

The theme song of the competition was "Vodacom Soccer Spectacular (final)".

Finalists and results

First Legs
Matlama                   3-0 Qalo
Bantu FC              0-0 LCS
Manamela                  0-1 LDF
Lioli                     1-2 Likhopo

Second Legs
LDF                       3-0 Manamela
Lioli                     1-1 Likhopo
Matlama                   4-1 Qalo
LCS                       2-1 Bantu FC

Semifinals
Likhopo                   1-2 Matlama
LCS                       2-0 LDF

Third Place Match
Likhopo                   3-1 LDF

Final
Matlama                   1-0 LCS

Winners

References

Football competitions in Lesotho
Recurring sporting events established in 2008